The GE C40-8W is a 6-axle diesel-electric locomotive built by GE Transportation Systems from 1989 to 1994. Often referred to as a Dash 8-40CW, it is part of the GE Dash 8 Series of freight locomotives. This locomotive model is distinguished from the predecessor Dash 8-40C by the addition of a newer "wide" or "safety" cab. A cowl-bodied version of this locomotive, built only for the Canadian market, was the GE Dash 8-40CM.

History

The first Dash 8-40CW, 9356, was built for the Union Pacific railroad in December 1989. In total, GE would build 756 Dash 8-40CWs. The Dash 8-40CW was succeeded by the Dash 9-44CW in 1994.

Like most GE locomotives, the Dash 8-40CW saw continuous upgrades over the course of its production. Later model Conrail units were built with split cooling systems for the turbocharger intercooler and engine cooling (previous Dash 8 series had both on the same cooling system). The later units delivered to Conrail in 1993 and 1994 were equipped with GE's Integrated Function Displays (IFD). The IFDs are LCD displays that provide the engineer with the same information previously provided by analog gauges, as well as integrating distance counter and End of Train Device telemetry functions.

As of 2021, while many C40-8W locomotives are still in service, most are either being stored in "dead lines" by Class I railroads, have been retired and/or sold to other railroads or leasing companies, or have been cut up for scrap.

Technical 
The Dash 8-40CW is powered by a  V16 7FDL diesel engine driving a GE GMG187 main alternator.

Depending on customer options, the Dash 8-40CW carries approximately 5000 US gallons (18927 L) of diesel fuel, 410 US gal (1,552 L) of lubricating oil, and 380 gallons (1,438 L) of coolant.

Rebuilds

Since no four-axle versions of this unit were built, the "C" designation (indicating trucks with three powered axles, or C-C) is often omitted.

The GE Dash 8.5-40CW was a 6-axle 4,000 hp (2,800 kW) diesel-electric locomotive rebuilt by Norfolk Southern. The first locomotive started its rebuild in 2012. Only one unit is on the active roster, and it is stored. The units will be rebuilt with the Norfolk Southern-designed wide-nose RLS cab which meets current FRA crashworthiness standards. The rebuild will also include the installation of locomotive speed limiter (LSL), and cab signals and other electronics upgrades. NS discontinued the rebuild program in April 2016 due to repeated failures, and even retired these locomotives in April 2020.

The GE C40-8WM was an experimental rebuild program done by GE in partnership with CSX at GE's Locomotive plant at Erie, PA in late 2016 and early 2017 to see if they were worth rebuilding. The program consisted of 10 C40-8Ws from CSX, #'s 7771, 7774, 7799, 7801, 7807, 7811, 7786 ,7787, 7779 & 7780, the units were rebuilt with updated prime movers, new cab interiors, new control system (upgrade to CCA from IFC), installation of PTC equipment, fresh repaint, body work as needed, addition of shutters to the radiator to help more accurately control the engine temperature, and a few other refurbs.

Current and former owners

See also

List of GE locomotives

References 

 
 
 
 
 

Dash 8-40C
C-C locomotives
Diesel-electric locomotives of the United States
Freight locomotives